Science fiction is a genre of fiction dealing with the impact of imagined innovations in science or technology.

Science Fiction may also refer to:

Music
Science Fiction (Blackmail album), 1999
Science Fiction (Ornette Coleman album), 1972
Science Fiction (Alice Cooper album), 1991
Science Fiction (Brand New album), 2017
"Science Fiction" (song), a song by Australian rock group Divinyls
Science Fiction (Tom Bailey album), a 2018 solo album by Thompson Twins frontman Tom Bailey
Science Fiction (Jonathan Thulin album), 2015

Publications
Science Fiction: The 100 Best Novels, a 1985 nonfiction book by David Pringle
Science Fiction (American magazine) (1939–41)
Science Fiction (Australian magazine), (1977–)
Science Fiction (Polish magazine) (2001–05)
"Science Fiction", a 1991 short story by Lawrence Watt-Evans

See also
 Science Friction (disambiguation)